is a notable ancestor who originated in Hawaiki according to Māori tradition.

On the island of Aitutaki, he is also known as a brother of Ruatapu, but is not as famous as him. In an account, probably from the Kāti Kurī hapū of Ngāi Tahu, the family lived on Mangaia.

's shame
 became offended when his father  elevated his older half-brother  ahead of him.

Some tellings also say Uenuku had built a canoe for his 70 sons and set about to do their hair with sacred combs for the first voyage, or that Ruatapu was about to use Uenuku's own sacred comb rather than Kahutia's. Either way, Ruatapu is told he cannot use any sacred comb because of his heritage, and is shamed.

In other accounts, the rebuke came when  dared to walk on the roof of 's crib.

's revenge

Angry and ashamed at his father's disparaging comments, he lured  and a large number of the other noble sons of  into a canoe the next day and took them out to sea. He had hid the bailer somewhere onshore prior, and as soon as they were far enough he unplugged a preformed hole on the canoe flooring, drowning all members aboard - apart from  who recited an incantation invoking his ancestor Tangaroa, or the goddess Moakuramanu, to call forth a whale (usually considered to be a southern humpback whale -  to carry him ashore.  was the sole survivor of his brother's evildoing and assumed the name  as a memorial of the assistance he received from the whale.

In some versions,  himself transformed into the whale. In some tellings Ruatapu simply slays everybody with a spear once they're out at sea - again with the exception of Paikea who takes to the oceans and is saved by the gods.

The waves of 
The episode where  threatens to return as the great waves of the eighth month may explain other accounts which portray  as having invoked a great flood which destroyed Hawaiki. Such accounts or conclusions may result from Christian influence. According to 's account in the  accounts,  shouted out to  that he would return to fight him: "The great waves of the eighth month, they are me! I am then approaching!" In an endnote, Reedy writes:

In this episode  announces that in the eighth month he will take this form, and follow .

The eighth month of the Māori calendar is Kohitātea (December-January) according to Ngāi Tūhoe.

connection
 is the Ngāti Porou hapū that is closely associated with Whāngārā, a small settlement located between Gisborne and Tolaga Bay.

Kāti Kurī version
In a version probably recorded from Kaikōura, Paikea was the youngest of Uenuku's sons, and his favourite, which made the other siblings incredibly jealous of him. His brothers plot to kill him, intending to slay him out on a fishing trip and tell Uenuku that he drowned. Paikea, through feigning his sleep that night, learned of the plan, and so deliberately sunk the canoe the next day himself, killing his brothers. Paikea alone remained alive, clinging to the remains of the canoe for survival, awaiting his death. Suddenly, a tohorā came to his aid, and carried him all the way to Whāngārā.

See also

 Jonah

References

External links
 , a Māori folk song, with English translation and discussion.

Legendary Māori people
Legendary progenitors
Māori mythology